Vaceuchelus cavernosus is a species of sea snail, a marine gastropod mollusk in the family Chilodontaidae.

Description
The altitude of the shell attains 7½ mm, its maximum diameter 7¼ mm.

A small globular white shell, containing five whorls; very conspicuously and profoundly pitted between the rounded nodulous keels.

Distribution
This marine species occurs off Sri Lanka.

References

External links
 To World Register of Marine Species
 To Encyclopedia of Life

cavernosus
Gastropods described in 1905